Mike Kjølø (born 27 October 1971) is a Norwegian former football defender.

He won the 1995 1. divisjon with Skeid, and after impressing in the Eliteserien for two seasons, where he played every game, he won a transfer to AIK. Here he won the 1998 Allsvenskan and the 1999 Cup. He was capped once for Norway. Subsequently, bought by Stabæk, Kjølø crowned a long career by winning the 2008 Tippeligaen.

After retiring he became a football agent, and among others arranged the transfer to Jong PSV for his own son Mathias Kjølø.

References

1971 births
Living people
Footballers from Oslo
Norwegian footballers
Strømmen IF players
Skeid Fotball players
AIK Fotboll players
Stabæk Fotball players
Norwegian First Division players
Eliteserien players
Allsvenskan players
Norwegian expatriate footballers
Expatriate footballers in Sweden
Norwegian expatriate sportspeople in Sweden
Norway international footballers
Association football defenders